Starlit Time was a variety series on the DuMont Television Network. The series aired from April 9 to November 19, 1950. This show aired Sundays at 7pm ET, and replaced Front Row Center which ended April 2. Bela Lugosi made a rare TV guest appearance on May 21.

Episode status
As with most DuMont series, no episodes are known to exist.

See also
List of programs broadcast by the DuMont Television Network
List of surviving DuMont Television Network broadcasts
1950–51 United States network television schedule

References

Bibliography
David Weinstein, The Forgotten Network: DuMont and the Birth of American Television (Philadelphia: Temple University Press, 2004) 
Alex McNeil, Total Television, Fourth edition (New York: Penguin Books, 1980) 
Tim Brooks and Earle Marsh, The Complete Directory to Prime Time Network TV Shows, Third edition (New York: Ballantine Books, 1964)

External links

DuMont historical website

DuMont Television Network original programming
1950 American television series debuts
1950 American television series endings
Black-and-white American television shows
Lost American television shows